Belinda Smith (born 1 June 1995) is an Australian rules footballer playing for West Coast in the AFL Women's (AFLW).

Born in Lake Grace, Western Australia, Smith was drafted by Fremantle with their 13th selection and 100th overall in the 2016 AFL Women's draft. She made her debut in the thirty-two point loss to the Western Bulldogs at VU Whitten Oval in the opening round of the 2017 season. She played every match in her debut season to finish with seven matches.

In June 2018, Smith was delisted by Fremantle and was signed by the Western Bulldogs as a free agent.

In April 2019, Smith joined expansion club West Coast.

References

External links 

1995 births
Living people
Fremantle Football Club (AFLW) players
Australian rules footballers from Western Australia
Western Bulldogs (AFLW) players
West Coast Eagles (AFLW) players